Louis Walsh (born 1952) is an Irish entertainment manager and television personality.

Louis Walsh may also refer to:
Louis Walsh (footballer), English footballer
Louis Walsh (politician), member of Seanad Éireann
Louis Joseph Walsh (1880–1942), Irish republican activist and author
Louis Sebastian Walsh (1858–1924), American prelate of the Roman Catholic Church